Lisle Kinney is a musician from New Zealand.  His full name is David Lisle Kinney. From 1967 onwards he was a semi-professional musician, playing mainly in cabaret bands.  He played bass in the following bands: October while at the University of Auckland (Graham Brazier was also in October); Brown Street, the resident band at the Great Northern Hotel; Hello Sailor and DD Smash.  He had to leave DD Smash after a road accident. After this however, Lisle played bass with Sonny Day in the Coromandel "Better start saving up" tour of '87.

References 

 Dix, John, Stranded in Paradise, Penguin, 2005. 
 Eggleton, David, Ready To Fly, Craig Potton, 2003. 
 Roadie Campbell GILLMAN.

External links 
 Hello Sailor at New Zealand Music of the 60's and 70's

Year of birth missing (living people)
Living people
New Zealand musicians